The 1938 NCAA Wrestling Championships were the 11th NCAA Wrestling Championships to be held. Penn State University in State College, Pennsylvania hosted the tournament at Rec Hall.

Oklahoma A&M took home the team championship with 19 points and having three individual champions.

Joe McDaniel of Oklahoma A&M was named the Outstanding Wrestler.

Team results

Individual finals

References

NCAA Division I Wrestling Championship
Wrestling competitions in the United States
1938 in American sports
1938 in Pennsylvania